Giri River is a tributary of the Yamuna river that flows in the state of Himachal Pradesh in India.

See also 
 Yamuna river

References 

Rivers of Himachal Pradesh
Tributaries of the Yamuna River